Vanessa Roth is an American filmmaker who writes, produces and directs non-fiction films. She has won a number of awards for her films, including a 2008 Academy Award for Best Short Documentary for Freeheld; an Emmy Honors Award for Social Impact and a IDA Nomination for best doc series for her Netflix series, Daughters of Destiny; an Alfred I duPont-Columbia award for Taken In: The Lives of America's Foster Children; Impact Doc Awards for Outstanding Achievement in filmmaking for The Girl and The Picture; two Sundance Special Jury Prizes; two Cine Golden Eagles; two Casey Medals; and a MacArthur Grant. She directed Mary J. Blige's My Life (2021).

Some of her films include Liberation Heroes: The Last Eyewitnesses, The Girl and the Picture, Freeheld, Close to Home, Aging Out, The Third Monday in October, 9/11’s Toxic Dust, No Tomorrow, The Other Side, American Teacher,  and The Texas Promise. She was also the executive producer, writer, and director of Daughters of Destiny: The Journey of Shanti Bhavan - a four-part Netflix original documentary series released in 2017.

Personal life 
She earned a master's degree in social work with a minor in family law from Columbia University. She lives in Shelter Island, New York, and has three children. She is the daughter of Academy Award-Winning screenwriter Eric Roth and archeologist Linda Roth.

References

External links
Big Year Productions
The Teacher Salary Project
The Third Monday in October
The Texas Promise Official Website

Living people
American documentary filmmakers
American film directors
Columbia University School of Social Work alumni
Year of birth missing (living people)
Directors of Best Documentary Short Subject Academy Award winners
American women documentary filmmakers
21st-century American women